Elections were held in South Carolina on Tuesday, November 2, 2010. Primary elections were held on June 8, 2010, and a run-off election for certain contests was held on June 22, 2010.

Federal

United States Senate 

Republican incumbent Jim DeMint was seeking re-election to the United States Senate, facing Democratic contender Alvin Greene and Green Party candidate Tom Clements.

United States House 

All six of South Carolina's seats in the United States House of Representatives were up for election in 2010.

State

Governor

Incumbent Republican Governor Mark Sanford was term-limited and unable to seek re-election. Republican Nikki Haley and Democrat Vincent Sheheen, along with third-party candidate Morgan Bruce Reeves, contested the seat. The gubernatorial race was one of the closest in the state, as well as the country, despite the Republican wave on both the state and national level that year.  Haley gained national attention as the first non-white and first woman Republican nominee for governor in South Carolina, and for her associations with the national Tea Party and former Alaska Governor Sarah Palin, who endorsed her in the primary. Haley eventually won the race.

Lieutenant Governor
Republican Ken Ard and Democrat Ashley Cooper were the major party nominees for lieutenant governor.  Incumbent Andre Bauer decided not to run for re-election in order to run for governor.  He came in fourth in the GOP primary.  Ard won the general election.  A little over a year after being sworn in, he resigned after being indicted for misappropriation of campaign funds for personal expenses.

Ard, a businessman and Florence County Councilman, won a four-way primary after a run-off with Bill Connor, a veteran and attorney in Orangeburg.  Other candidates were Larry Richter, a former state judge and former state Senator from Mount Pleasant, and Eleanor Kitzman, former director of the state Department of Insurance.

Secretary of State
Republican Mark Hammond ran for re-election as Secretary of State of South Carolina against Democrat Marjorie Johnson, a retired spokeswoman for a Washington, D.C. municipal sanitation corporation.  Neither faced primary opposition.

Treasurer
Republican Curtis Loftis ran unopposed for the office of Treasurer of South Carolina.  He defeated acting Treasurer Converse Chellis in the Republican primary.  Chellis was appointed to the position by Governor Sanford after his predecessor, Thomas Ravenel, was convicted of possessing cocaine with intent to distribute and resigned.  Loftis, the Director of Transparency at the Office of the Comptroller General, received some negative coverage when Chellis ran negative ads attacking him for having been arrested for assaulting his wife.  (Loftis was later found not guilty.)

Attorney General
Republican Alan Wilson, Democrat Matthew Richardson, and Green Party candidate Leslie Wilson were the nominees for attorney general.  Wilson is the son of controversial South Carolina Congressman Joe Wilson.  The race was marked by high fundraising totals for both Wilson and Richardson, second only to the governor's race in total money raised and spent in the general election.  Wilson eventually won.

In the Republican primary, Wilson faced two other challengers: Columbia attorneys Leighton Lord and Robert Bolchoz.  Wilson eventually defeated Leighton Lord in a run-off.

Comptroller General
Incumbent Republican Richard Eckstrom ran for re-election against Democratic challenger Robert Barber.  Although Eckstrom attracted negative attention over his affair with Kelly Payne, one of the GOP candidates for Superintendent of Education, he eventually won.

In the Republican primary, Eckstrom defeated challenger Mike Meilinger, an accountant and consultant from Greenville.

Superintendent of Education
Candidates for Superintendent of Education in South Carolina included Republican Mick Zais, Democrat Frank Holleman, and third-party candidates Doretha Bull, Tony Fayyazi, and Tim Moultrie.  Zais did little campaigning in the general, despite the relatively high fundraising totals posted by Holleman, a former United States Deputy Secretary of Education and South Carolina State Democratic Party Chairman.  The general election race became the third most expensive statewide race in South Carolina in 2010, and one of the higher profile, in part because the perception that the outcome could be as close as it had been in 2006.  However, Zais eventually won.

Zais, a retired brigadier general and president of Newberry College, defeated Elizabeth Moffly in the GOP primary run-off.  Moffly, a 2006 candidate for the Republican nomination, did surprisingly well considering her low fundraising and poor result in the 2006 contest.  Other candidates included: Kelly Payne, an Irmo teacher; Gary Burgess, a former Laurens County school administrator who was arrested in 2009 for soliciting an immoral act; Brent Nelsen, a political science professor at Furman University; and Glenn Price, a Kershaw band teacher.  Moffly went on to be elected to the Charleston County School District Board of Trustees in November. 

Holleman defeated college administrator Tom Thompson in the Democratic primary.

Adjutant General
Republican Bob Livingston ran unopposed in the general election and faced no primary opposition.

Commissioner of Agriculture
Incumbent Republican Hugh Weathers ran for re-election against Democratic challenger Tom Elliott, a former Richland County treasurer and councilman.  Neither faced primary opposition.  The major issue in the race was the moving of the state farmers' market, which Elliott suggested had been done improperly.

State House of Representatives
All 124 seats in the South Carolina House of Representatives were up for election in 2010.

Judicial positions
Several Probate Court justices were up for election in 2010.  Most other judges are elected by the South Carolina General Assembly instead of by the general population.
South Carolina judicial elections, 2010 at Judgepedia

Ballot measures
Four measures appeared on the General Election ballot.

Amendment 1 amended Article I of the state Constitution to guarantee citizens the right to hunt, fish and trap wildlife, "subject to laws and regulations promoting sound wildlife conservation and management as prescribed by the General Assembly."

Amendment 2 amended Article II of the state Constitution "to provide that the fundamental right of an individual to vote by secret ballot is guaranteed for a designation, a selection, or an authorization for employee representation by a labor organization."

Amendment 3 amended Section 36(A) of Article III of the state Constitution "to increase from three to five percent in increments of one-half of one percent over four fiscal years the amount of state general fund revenue in the latest completed fiscal year required to be held in the General Reserve Fund."

Amendment 4 amended Section 36(A) of Article III of the state Constitution " to increase from three to five percent in increments of one-half of one percent over four fiscal years the amount of state general fund revenue in the latest completed fiscal year required to be held in the General Reserve Fund and to allow the percentage amount to be subsequently increased or decreased by separate legislative enactment passed by a two-thirds vote of the total membership of the Senate and a two-thirds vote of the total membership of the House of Representatives."

Local
Many elections for county and city offices were also be held on November 2, 2010.

External links
South Carolina State Election Commission
South Carolina Candidate List at Imagine Election - Search for candidates by address or zip code
South Carolina Congressional Races in 2010 for campaign finance data for federal races from OpenSecrets
South Carolina State Races in 2010 campaign finance data for state races from Follow the Money

References

 
South Carolina